The Vitosha New Otani Open is a defunct WTA Tour affiliated tennis tournament played from 1988 to 1989. It was held in Sofia in Bulgaria and played on outdoor hard courts in 1988 and on outdoor clay courts in 1989.

finals

Singles

Doubles

See also
 Sofia Open – men's tournament (1980–1981)

External links
 Draws WTA 1988
 Draws WTA 1989

 
Indoor tennis tournaments
Hard court tennis tournaments
Clay court tennis tournaments
Tennis tournaments in Bulgaria
WTA Tour